The Women's 50m butterfly event at the 2010 South American Games was held on March 27, with the heats at 10:00 and the Final at 18:00.

Medalists

Records

Results

Heats

Final

References
Heats
Final

Butterfly 50m W
Women's 50 metre butterfly
2010 in women's swimming